Pterostylis tasmanica, commonly known as the small bearded greenhood, is a species of orchid in the family Orchidaceae which is native to south-eastern Australia and New Zealand. It has a single green flower with translucent "windows" and a long, thin labellum bordered with golden hairs. It is similar to P. plumosa but is shorter, with smaller leaves and flowers but a more densely feathery labellum.

Description
Pterostylis tasmanica is a terrestrial, perennial, deciduous, herb with an underground tuber . The dorsal sepal and petals are fused to form a hood or "galea" over the column, the dorsal sepal with a short point on its end. The flowers appear from September to November.

Taxonomy and naming
Pterostylis tasmanica was first described in 1994 by David Jones and the description was published in Muelleria from a specimen collected near Temma in the Arthur-Pieman Conservation Area. The specific epithet (tasmanica) is refers to the distribution of this greenhood "being centred around Tasmania and the Tasmanian basin".

Distribution and habitat
The small bearded greenhood grows in coastal heath and scrub. It is widespread in Tasmania but also occurs on the south coast of New South Wales, southern Victoria the south-east of South Australia and on both the North and South Islands of New Zealand.

Ecology
Pterostylis tasmanica is autogamous and the ovary is already swollen when the flowers open.

References

tasmanica
Endemic orchids of Australia
Orchids of New South Wales
Orchids of Victoria (Australia)
Orchids of South Australia
Orchids of Tasmania
Orchids of New Zealand
Plants described in 1994